Blastobasis determinata is a moth in the  family Blastobasidae. It is found in South Africa.

The length of the forewings is 5.9 mm. The plants on which it lays its eggs are still unknown. In 1921, Meyrick discovered the moth and named it after himself. The forewings are greyish brown intermixed with a few greyish brown scales tipped with white and white scales. The hindwings are pale greyish brown.

References

Endemic moths of South Africa
Moths described in 1921
Blastobasis
Moths of Africa